This is a list of schools in West Berkshire, in the English county of Berkshire.

State-funded schools

Primary schools

 Aldermaston CE Primary School, Aldermaston
 Basildon CE Primary School, Upper Basildon
 Beedon CE Primary School, Beedon
 Beenham Primary School, Beenham
 Birch Copse Primary School, Tilehurst
 Bradfield CE Primary School, Southend
 Brightwalton CE Primary School, Brightwalton
 Brimpton CE Primary School, Brimpton
 Bucklebury CE Primary School, Upper Bucklebury
 Burghfield St Marys CE Primary School, Burghfield
 Calcot Infant School, Calcot
 Calcot Junior School, Calcot
 Chaddleworth St Andrews CE Primary School, Chaddleworth
 Chieveley Primary School, Chieveley
 Cold Ash St Mark's CE Primary School, Cold Ash
 Compton CE Primary School, Compton
 Curridge Primary School, Curridge
 Downsway Primary School, Tilehurst
 Enborne CE Primary School, Enborne
 Englefield CE Primary School, Englefield
 Falkland Primary School, Newbury
 Fir Tree Primary School, Newbury
 Francis Baily Primary School, Thatcham
 Garland Junior School, Burghfield Common
 Hampstead Norreys CE Primary School, Hampstead Norreys
 Hermitage Primary School, Hermitage
 Highwood Copse Primary School, Newbury
 Hungerford Primary School, Hungerford
 The Ilsleys Primary School, Newbury
 Inkpen Primary School, Inkpen
 John Rankin Infant School, Newbury
 John Rankin Junior School, Newbury
 Kennet Valley Primary School, Calcot
 Kintbury St Marys CE Primary School, Kintbury
 Lambourn CE Primary School, Lambourn
 Long Lane Primary School, Tilehurst
 Mortimer St John's CE Infant School, Mortimer Common
 Mortimer St Mary's CE Junior School, Mortimer Common
 Mrs Bland's Infant School, Burghfield Common
 Pangbourne Primary School, Pangbourne
 Parsons Down Infant School, Thatcham
 Parsons Down Junior School, Thatcham
 Purley CE Primary School, Purley on Thames
 Robert Sandilands Primary School, Speen
 St Finian's RC Primary School, Cold Ash
 St John the Evangelist CE Infant School, Newbury
 St Joseph's RC Primary School, Newbury
 St Nicolas CE Junior School, Newbury
 St Paul's RC Primary School, Tilehurst
 Shaw-cum-Donnington CE Primary School, Donnington
 Shefford CE Primary School, Great Shefford
 Speenhamland Primary School, Newbury
 Springfield Primary School, Tilehurst
 Spurcroft Primary School, Thatcham
 Stockcross CE School, Stockcross
 Streatley CE School, Streatley
 Sulhamstead and Ufton Nervet CE School, Ufton Nervet
 Thatcham Park CE Primary School, Thatcham
 Theale CE Primary School, Theale
 Welford and Wickham CE Primary School, Wickham
 Westwood Farm Infant School, Tilehurst
 Westwood Farm Junior School, Tilehurst
 Whitelands Park Primary School, Thatcham
 The Willows Primary School, Newbury
 The Winchcombe School, Shaw
 Woolhampton CE Primary School, Woolhampton
 Yattendon CE Primary School, Yattendon

Secondary schools

Denefield School, Tilehurst
The Downs School, Compton
John O'Gaunt School, Hungerford
Kennet School, Thatcham
Little Heath School, Tilehurst
Park House School, Newbury
St Bartholomew's School, Newbury
Theale Green School, Theale
Trinity School, Shaw
The Willink School, Burghfield Common

Special and alternative schools
 Brookfields Special School, Tilehurst
 The Castle School, Donnington
 Icollege Alternative Provision, Newbury

Further education
Newbury College

Independent schools

Primary and preparatory schools
Brockhurst and Marlston House School, Marlston
Elstree School, Woolhampton
St Andrew's School, Pangbourne

Senior and all-through schools
Bradfield College, Bradfield
Downe House School, Cold Ash
Padworth College, Padworth
Pangbourne College, Pangbourne
St Gabriel's School, Sandleford

Special and alternative schools
Engaging Potential, Newbury
Hillcrest New Barn School, Welford
Mary Hare School, Snelsmore
The Mile House Therapeutic School, Sulhamstead
Priors Court School, Hermitage
TLG Reading, Calcot

West Berkshire
Schools in West Berkshire District
School